The German Templer Society emerged in Germany during the mid-nineteenth century, with its roots in the Pietist movement of the Lutheran Church, and in its history a legacy of preceding centuries during which various Christian groups undertook to establish what they saw as the perfect Christian religion in preparation for Christ's promised return. The movement was founded by Christoph Hoffmann [1815-1885], who believed that humanity’s salvation lay in the gathering of God's people in a Christian community. He also believed that the second coming of Christ was imminent, and that according to Biblical prophecy it would take place in Jerusalem, where God's people were to gather as a symbol of the rebuilding of the temple. He established a number of German Templer colonies in Palestine.

Hoffmann’s thinking was inspired by the 1st century Christian community and based on Matthew’s Gospel in regard to Old Testament prophecies and their relevance to the coming of Jesus Christ. Hoffmann also believed that these "prophecies concerned mainly the founding of the Kingdom of God on earth."

Etymology
The word Templer is derived from the concept of the Christian Community as described in the New Testament, see 1 Corinthians  and 1 Peter , where every person and the community are seen as temples in which God's spirit dwells. There is no connection to the Medieval Knights Templar (who derived their name from the Temple Mount in Jerusalem).

Establishment of colonies in Palestine

In deciding where a Christian community should be established, Hoffmann wrote, "I made a special study, to discover if a center were named in the prophesies. I found that some Prophets declared Jerusalem to be the center. Others mentioned Israel, that is, Palestine, to be the external manifestation of the Kingdom of God on this earth. The prophesies stress the importance of uniting and gathering God's people. This is the responsibility of those who wish to work for the salvation of mankind. There is no doubt – and I believe it with all my heart – this Kingdom of God has a complementary, temporal meaning as well as a spiritual one. For instance, in a Christian State, a Kingdom of God, the misery and famine among poor people after a crop failure is uncalled for! The Kingdom of God is a happy state. This is emphasised in all the Biblical prophesies, and should exist for all people. The Prophets point to Jerusalem as the Center of the Kingdom of God, a Happy State!"

Timeline of the Temple Society
 1845 Hoffman begins publishing the journal Süddeutsche Warte
 1861 The Temple Society was founded in south-west Germany by Christoph Hoffmann (1815–1885) and others, following a split with the Evangelical-Lutheran Church in Württemberg (7/10/1859) over dogmatic rituals. Plans for a move to Palestine were considered.
 The centre of the new movement was from 1856 on at Kirschenhardthof, where a community hall and a school were commissioned in July that year. The community consisted of 9 properties of approximately 5ha each. It could at most accommodate 132 residents.
 Attempts by impatient members to settle on their own in Palestine in 1867, at Samunieh, had tragic consequences: of the 25 persons in the group 15 died within a year, 7 in Medjedel and 8 in Samunieh.
 1868 Beginning of carefully planned migration of Templers to the Holy Land (then part of the Ottoman Empire). In 1869 begins the construction of the first house in Haifa, the community hall (Gemeindehaus). Over many years urban and rural settlements with community halls and schools, commercial, trade, farm and transport enterprises were established in a number of locations including Haifa, Jaffa and Jerusalem.
 The faith and ideas of the Templers also spread to the Plautdietsch-speaking Russian Mennonite settlement of Molotschna where Johann Lange, former student from Württemberg, formed the Tempelhof congregation in Gnadenfeld after years of bitter controversy.
 1874 schism of the Temple Society, with a third of the members seceding and founding the Temple Association (Tempelverein) in 1878, later joining the Evangelical State Church of Prussia's older Provinces
 1875 Publication of 'Occident und Orient, Part 1' by Christoph Hoffmann. English translation 1995 'The Temple Society and its Settlements in the Holy Land' , Occident and Orient, Part 1.
 1921 Templers who had been interned in Helouan, Egypt, towards the end of World War I returned to their settlements in Palestine, now a British Mandate. The settlements soon flourished again.
 1939 German Templers were interned in Palestine at the outbreak of World War II.
 1941 Over 500 Templers from Palestine were transported to Australia, where internment continued in Tatura, Victoria, until 1946-7. In December, 65 persons take part in an exchange program from Palestine to Germany.
 1942 In November, 302 persons take part in an exchange program from Palestine to Germany.
 1944 In July, 112 persons take part in an exchange program from Palestine to Germany.
 1948 Formation of the State of Israel. Templers cannot return there, those left had to leave.  most live in Australia and Germany.

Temple Society Australia

 1948-50 Australian Templers consolidate around Melbourne, Sydney and Adelaide. Over the years church halls and community centres were established at Boronia, Bayswater and Bentleigh in Melbourne, Meadowbank in Sydney and at Tanunda near Adelaide.
 1950 Formation of the Temple Society Australia with Dr. Richard Hoffmann as Regional Head
 1970 Australian and German Templer Regions linked formally by appointment of Dr. R. O. Hoffmann as President of the Temple Society
 1972 Templer Home for the Aged opened in Bayswater
 1979 Tabulam Nursing Home, located next to the Templer Home for the Aged, begun as a joint undertaking with the Australian-German Welfare Society.
 1981 New Youth Group club room and school rooms completed at Bayswater.
 1986 Templers in Germany and Australia celebrate 125 years of Temple Society.
 1987 Sydney Templers secure places in the St. Hedwig Homes for the Aged of the Catholic German Community of St. Raphael in Blacktown NSW, opened in 1989.
 1988 Dr Richard Hoffmann retires. Dietrich Ruff is elected as the new President of the Temple Society
 1990s New initiatives: Templer residential unit development in Bayswater, Kids' Club, Australian-German Templer Exchange, Country Victorian Templer Groups
 2001/2 Dietrich Ruff retires. Peter Lange is elected as the new President of the Temple Society
 2002 A new Temple Chapel is built in the Bayswater Community Centre. Extensive Remodel of the TTHA.
 2005 TSA Constitution changed to reflect the lifestyle of its members in Australia. It is no longer a community-based organisation, but one consisting of many focus and interest groups.

Tempelgesellschaft in Germany
 1949 After a pause of 10 years, publication of Die Warte des Tempels is resumed in September. Rundschreiben keeps members informed.
 1950 Management office installed at Mozartstraße 58, Stuttgart, where meetings and religious services were held. Treffpunkt Mozartstraße became hub of social activities.
 1954, at a General Meeting in September a revision of the 20-year-old constitution is proposed.
 1962, on January 27 the new constitution was finalised and accepted and the Tempelgesellschaft in Deutschland e.V. (TGD) instituted. A move to larger premises initiated.
 1967 New community centre officially opened in Felix-Dahn-Straße, Degerloch
 1970 the Australian and German Templer Regions formally linked by the appointment of Dr. R. O. Hoffmann as President of the society.
 1976 TGD joins Bund für Freies Christentum.

See also
 Sarona, a former Templer colony, now a neighborhood in Tel Aviv

References

External links

 "History of the Temple Society"
 "Temple Society Australia"
 Tempelgesellschaft in Deutschland (Temple Society in Germany)
 Templers Cemetery in Jerusalem
 Templers Cemetery in Haifa
 The Templers in Israel and their Place in the Local Society

 
Christian denominations founded in Germany
German diaspora
Lutheran denominations established in the 19th century
Religious organizations established in 1861
Christian new religious movements
1861 establishments in Germany
Radical Pietism